Forest Cove is a neighborhood of Agoura Hills, California.

This residential district is composed of relatively compact detached homes, some reminiscent of the French Provincial style of architecture, with the large Forest Cove Park as the community's center.

On the southern edge of Forest Cove, in a subdistrict called Strawberry Hill, there are a number of medium density apartments with interesting architecture and Agoura Hills' fire station. For years, a large Hawaiian flag has flown over Strawberry Hill, leading some to christen the district "Little Hawai'i".

Neighborhoods in Agoura Hills, California